Elvira Catalina Quintana Molina (7 November 1935 – 8 August 1968) was a Spanish-Mexican actress and singer.

Early life and career
Born in Montijo, Spain, Quintana and her family migrated to Mexico when she was 5 years old. She began her career working in theatre and later participated in films as an extra. Her first important role was as Carmen Ochoa in "Una solución inesperada", a segment of the drama film Canasta de cuentos mexicanos (1956). She then enrolled in the National Association of Actors' theatre and film institute (Instituto Teatral y Cinematográfico). She was given her first starring role in El buen ladrón (1957) before her breakthrough in Bolero inmortal (1958), in which she debuted as a singer; the film's soundtrack album, for which she recorded songs, was a commercial success throughout Hispanic America. She starred opposite Pedro Armendáriz, her favorite actor, in Dos hijos desobedientes (1960). Greatly admired by audiences for her beauty and talent, she became one of the most popular Mexican performers of the 1960s. Her last appearances were in the telenovelas El dolor de amar (1966), in which she played a villain for the first time, and Felipa Sánchez, la soldadera (1967), in which the press declared she created "an unforgettable character" as the title role.

Death and legacy
Quintana, who never married, suffered from pancreatic problems and kidney failure during her last months. She died of a stroke on 8 August 1968, in Mexico City; she was survived by her mother, Alejandra Molina, and her two siblings, Juana Quintana Molina and José Díaz Molina. She was interred at the Panteón Jardín on 9 August.

A street in Montijo, her hometown, is named after her.

Filmography
 The Mystery of the Express Car (1953)
 Look What Happened to Samson (1955)
El vendedor de muñecas (1955)
Furias desatadas (1957)
Dangers of Youth (1960) 
 Invincible Guns (1960)
 Revolver en Guardia (1960)
 The Curse of the Doll People (1961)
Tres muchachas de Jalisco (1964)
Me Llaman El Cantaclaro(1964)
Tintanson Cruzoe (1965)
Las Tapatias nunca pierden (1965)
Lástima de Ropa (1971)

Discography

Studio albums
 Bolero inmortal (1958)
 Diferente (1963)
 Toda una vida (1965)
 Acércate más (1966)

Compilation albums
 La inolvidable Elvira Quintana (1968)

References

External links

1935 births
1968 deaths
Mexican film actresses
Mexican television actresses
Mexican stage actresses
Bolero singers
Ranchera singers
Mexican women poets
People from Badajoz
Spanish emigrants to Mexico
20th-century Mexican actresses
20th-century Mexican poets
20th-century Mexican women singers
20th-century Mexican women writers